Hormozabad (also Romanized as Hormozābād) is a village in Gavork-e Sardasht Rural District, in the Central District of Sardasht County, West Azerbaijan Province, Iran. At the 2006 census, its population was 85, in 13 families.

References 

Populated places in Sardasht County